The Friesenheimer Insel - Sandofen ferry is Germany's oldest working chain ferry. It connects Sandhofen with the Friesenheimer Island on a  daily basis between 15 March and 31 October.

The ferry was built in 1897 in Neckarsulm. It uses a cable  powered by a 1975 diesel engine. The maximum capacity is 145 persons or 10 tons.

Rhine
Cable ferries in Germany
1897 establishments in Germany